Andrea Ghiurghi (born December 15, 1966) is a male beach volleyball player from Italy, who competed at the 1996 Summer Olympics in Atlanta for his native country. In 1993 he won the bronze medal at the first official European Championships in men's beach volleyball, partnering Dio Lequaglie. In 1996 with Nicola Grigolo he won another bronze medal at the European Championships Master in Pescara. His best international finishes are three 2nd places in the FIVB World Tour in 1991, 1996 and 2005 with Dio Lequaglie, Nicola Grigolo and Gianni Mascagna respectively. At the national level he won eight national titles in 1985, 1986, 1989, 1991, 1992, 1993, 1994 and 2003.

During his career, for several years he carried out a peculiar "double life" playing professional beach volleyball and working as a biologist in Africa. At present he works as free lance consultant for several conservation projects in the African continent and in Europe.

Playing partners
 Dio Lequaglie
 Nicola Grigolo
 Riccardo Lione
 Gianni Mascagna
 Massimo Penteriani
 Maurizio Pimponi
 Giorgio Pallotta
 Enrico Corsetti
 Marco Solustri

References

External links
 
 
 

1966 births
Living people
Italian beach volleyball players
Men's beach volleyball players
Beach volleyball players at the 1996 Summer Olympics
Olympic beach volleyball players of Italy
Sportspeople from Rome